Vit Ice Piedmont is the glacier extending 12 km in north-south direction and 6 km in east-west direction in Sostra Heights on the east side of northern Sentinel Range in Ellsworth Mountains, Antarctica.  It is situated north of the end of Embree Glacier, east of Bracken Peak, southwest of Anchialus Glacier and south of the end of Newcomer Glacier.  The glacier flows eastwards into Rutford Ice Stream.

The glacier is named after Vit River in Northern Bulgaria.

Location
US mapping in 1961.

See also
 List of glaciers in the Antarctic
 Glaciology

Maps
 Newcomer Glacier.  Scale 1:250 000 topographic map.  Reston, Virginia: US Geological Survey, 1961.
 Antarctic Digital Database (ADD). Scale 1:250000 topographic map of Antarctica. Scientific Committee on Antarctic Research (SCAR). Since 1993, regularly updated.

External links
 Vit Ice Piedmont SCAR Composite Gazetteer of Antarctica
 Bulgarian Antarctic Gazetteer Antarctic Place-names Commission (Bulgarian)
 Basic data (English)

 

Glaciers of Ellsworth Land
Bulgaria and the Antarctic